Assoc. Prof. Dr. Asim Vehbi  (born 1966 in Nicosia) is the CEO and Vice-Chancellor of Girne American University. He is also the former Minister of Environment and Natural Resources of the Turkish Republic of North Cyprus.

Biography
He received his Ph.D. in Business Administration in 2012 from Girne American University, his master's degree in the field of International Relations and the European Union in 1996 and he has completed his Business Management degree from Northern Michigan University in the United States.

Vehbi started in 2004 to work at Girne American University (GAU) as Vice-Chairman of the Board of Directors and was appointed in 2012 as Chief Executive Officer.
Between 2006-2008, as the Minister of Environment and Natural Resources of North Cyprus, he has developed projects in more efficient use of natural resources and contributing to the country's economy in recent times has been the most influential name.
Solution-oriented in any position where both academic and political career, which can detect the target, just, can cope with the challenges of information and research-based, strategic planning, leadership in carrying out the activities based, national and international meetings, the institutions represented in terms of management and coordination of internal and external relations has taken important steps by Vehbi.

Between 1988 and 1990, he was the Minister of Environment and Natural Resources as well as the Cyprus International University (CIU) Founder General Secretary.

Vehbi speaks fluent English and German. He is married and has two children.

References

External links
 

1966 births
Living people
Northern Michigan University alumni
People from North Nicosia
Türk Maarif Koleji alumni
Turkish Cypriot academics
University rectors in Northern Cyprus
Turkish Cypriot expatriates in the United States
Government ministers of Northern Cyprus